Soner Ergençay (born 25 August 1988 in Urla) is a Turkish professional footballer. He currently plays as left winger for Balıkesirspor in the Turkish Second League.
He started his career with Beşiktaş A2 and also played for İstanbulspor and Eyüpspor.

His loan contract will end on 31 May 2011 by his profile in Turkey Football Federation.

References

External links
TFF.org profile

1988 births
Living people
People from Urla, Izmir
Turkish footballers
Beşiktaş J.K. footballers
İstanbulspor footballers
Balıkesirspor footballers
Association football midfielders